Raww was a United States-based short-lived music group best known for their hit "Don't You Try It", released by Emergency Records in 1986. The single was released worldwide, including Germany by Bellaphon, Spain by Grind and Canada by Power Records, Holland and Brussels and Belgium. It was  written by the band's members whereas mixed by Freddy Bastone.

This song reached No. 34 on the American  dance chart and also received acknowledgement from Billboard and was selected into "Recommended Section" of the Billboard's noteworthy picks.

Chart performance

Discography

Singles
"Don't You Try It"

References

1986 establishments in New York City
Musical groups from New York City
Musical groups established in 1986
Musical groups disestablished in 1986
American garage house musicians
American post-disco music groups